DecoBike (also known as CityBike) is a bicycle sharing system deployed in City of Miami Beach.

History
DecoBike was rolled out on March 15, 2011 with approximately 60 kiosks & 500 bikes throughout Miami Beach. By 2014, the program has exceeded 3 million rides and had around 100 kiosks with 1,000 bikes. In October 2014, the bike-share program changed its name to CitiBike, reflecting sponsorship from Citibank. CityBike has plans to link the Miami Beach and City of Miami systems by the end of January 2015.

In August 2015, DecoBike program opened in San Diego with 200 stations and 1800 bikes. In September 2017, 15 DecoBike stations were removed from the boardwalk following Pacific Beach residents’ protests. In April 2019, city officials ordered the company to remove its stations, citing breach of contract.

See also

Bicycle rental
Bicycle culture
Free bicycle/Short term hire schemes
Sustainable transport
Carsharing
Collaborative consumption

References 

Community bicycle programs
Transportation in Miami Beach, Florida
2011 establishments in Florida
Bicycle sharing in the United States